Kwame Nsor (born 1 August 1992) is a Ghanaian professional footballer who plays for Portuguese club C.D. Cova da Piedade as a forward.

Career
Nsor joined German side 1. FC Kaiserslautern from FC Metz in July 2012 and made his debut for the club two months later, as a substitute for Enis Alushi in a 2. Bundesliga match against MSV Duisburg.

On 16 June 2013, SV Sandhausen announced that they had agreed upon a season-long loan deal with Kaiserslautern but then they stated on 7 July 2013 that the agreement did not become valid due to missing medical certificates. Kaiserslautern objected to that view.

On 2 September 2013, Nsor returned to FC Metz on a four-year deal.

References

External links
 
 

1992 births
Living people
Ghanaian footballers
Ghanaian expatriate footballers
Liga Portugal 2 players
Ligue 2 players
Challenger Pro League players
2. Bundesliga players
Tudu Mighty Jets FC players
Legon Cities FC players
Académico de Viseu F.C. players
FC Metz players
1. FC Kaiserslautern players
C.F. União players
C.D. Feirense players
C.D. Cova da Piedade players
Association football forwards
Ghanaian expatriate sportspeople in France
Ghanaian expatriate sportspeople in Germany
Ghanaian expatriate sportspeople in Belgium
Ghanaian expatriate sportspeople in Portugal
Expatriate footballers in France
Expatriate footballers in Germany
Expatriate footballers in Belgium
Expatriate footballers in Portugal